Keshya Nurvita Hanadia (born 21 December 1988) is an Indonesian badminton player. She won the 2008 Smiling Fish International in the mixed doubles with Lingga Lie. In 2011, she won in the same discipline at the Indonesia International together with Andhika Anhar. In the women's doubles event, she was the champion of the Auckland International.

Achievements

BWF Grand Prix 
The BWF Grand Prix had two levels, the Grand Prix and Grand Prix Gold. It was a series of badminton tournaments sanctioned by the Badminton World Federation (BWF) and played between 2007 and 2017.

Women's doubles

  BWF Grand Prix Gold tournament
  BWF Grand Prix tournament

International Challenge/Series 
Women's doubles

Mixed doubles

  BWF International Challenge tournament
  BWF International Series tournament

Performance timeline

Individual competitions 
 Senior level

References 

1988 births
Living people
People from Tasikmalaya
Sportspeople from West Java
Indonesian female badminton players